Loda Raj Anand (died 6 March 1987) was an Indian film dialogue and screenwriter in Hindi cinema, who worked on many Raj Kapoor films, starting with Aag (1948), Aah (1953), Anari (1959) and Sangam (1963). While formally referred to as a writer for Hindi films, he was actually an Urdu writer, writing his scripts and dialogues in Urdu.

He was father to actor-director Tinnu Anand and producer Bittu Anand. Inder's grandson is noted film director Siddharth Anand (Salaam Namaste (2005) and Anjaana Anjaani (2010)). Famous director Mukul Anand was Inder's nephew. Shahenshah, starring Amitabh Bachchan, was Inder's last film as a writer. It was produced by his son, Bittu, and was directed by Tinnu. Shahenshah was released after Inder's death and it became one of the biggest hits of that year.

Career
Anand started off as a writer for Prithviraj Kapoor's Prithvi Theatres and also People's Theatre in Mumbai, and was a close friend of writer-director K.A. Abbas through IPTA.

In his career, Inder Anand wrote almost 120 films including Safar, Sangam and Ek Duuje Ke Liye. Many of his films like Haathi Mere Saathi, Jaani Dushman and Shahenshah were successful.

Filmography

References

Bibliography

External links
 
 

Indian male screenwriters
1987 deaths
Year of birth missing
Hindi cinema
Punjabi people
20th-century Indian screenwriters
20th-century Indian male writers